Bjørn Arne Nyland (born 8 October 1962) is a Norwegian speed skater.

He was born in Lillestrøm, and represented the clubs SK Ceres and Aktiv SK. He competed at the 1984 Winter Olympics in Sarajevo. He won a bronze medal at the 1983 European allround speed skating championships. In 1987 he became norwegian national allround speed skating champion at Hamar stadion, Hamar. The same season he also became the first national single distance champion of the 1500 meters at Stavanger, then outdoors at Sørmarka stadium, in the same single distance championships he also got a silver on the 1.000 meter behind Frode Rønning.

References

External links
 

1962 births
Living people
People from Lillestrøm
Norwegian male speed skaters
Olympic speed skaters of Norway
Speed skaters at the 1984 Winter Olympics
Sportspeople from Viken (county)
20th-century Norwegian people